KSAI (936 AM) was a radio station owned by the Far East Broadcasting Company. Licensed to Susupe, Saipan, it served the greater Northern Mariana Islands area.

KSAI was on air from 1978 to 2002, when FEBC decided to focus on its shortwave station. Aside from airing religious programming, KSAI was also the first radio station on the island to air ethnic programming in Tagalog, Korean, and Chinese languages. Prior to 1978, KSAI was initially established by the United States Office of War Information in June 1945.

Shortwave Broadcast
FEBC also operated a shortwave station from 1984 to 2011.

References

SAI
Radio stations established in 1978
Defunct radio stations in the United States
Defunct religious radio stations in the United States
Radio stations disestablished in 2002
1978 establishments in the Northern Mariana Islands
2002 disestablishments in the Northern Mariana Islands
SAI
Saipan
Shortwave radio stations in the United States
News and talk radio stations in the United States
Far East Broadcasting Company